Sanger Independent School District is a public school district based in Sanger, Texas (USA).

In addition to Sanger, the district serves portions of Denton, and the unincorporated community of Bolivar.

In 2009, the school district was rated "academically acceptable" by the Texas Education Agency.

Schools
 High schools (Grades 9-12)
Sanger High School
 Middle schools
Sanger Middle School (Grades 7-8)
Sanger Sixth Grade Campus
 Elementary schools
Clear Creek Intermediate (Grades 3-5)
Butterfield Elementary (Grades Pre K-5)
Chisholm Trail Elementary (Grades K-2)
Alternative school
Linda Tutt Learning Center / Linda Tutt High School (alternative, for grades 9-12)
 Tutt High has a grocery store, jointly established by Albertsons, First Refuge Ministries, and Texas Health Resources, which accepts documentation of charitable acts by students, in lieu of cash, as a form of payment. Tutt also has a "Social Emotional Learning & Behavior" program for students with severe behavioral or mental health issues. Other school districts send students to Tutt for this program. Various non-profit organizations, some religious, fund the Linda Tutt initiatives, with some coming in the form of grants.

School District Board 
The school district's board of trustees is made up of eight members.
 Board trustees
 Jimmy Howard
 Place 1, Board Trustee
 Ann Marie Afflerbach
 Place 2, Board Secretary
 Sarah York
 Place 3, Vice-President
 Ken Scribner
 Place 4, Board President
 Lisa Cody
 Place 5, Board Trustee
 Mitch Hammonds
 Place 6, Board Trustee
 Zach Thompson
 Place 7, Board Trustee
 Dr. Tommy Hunter
 Superintendent of Schools

References

External links
 

School districts in Denton County, Texas